Lutodrilus is a genus of invertebrate in the Lutodrilidae family. 
It contains the following species:
 Lutodrilus multivesiculatus

Haplotaxida
Annelid genera
Taxonomy articles created by Polbot